Touched By Evil is a 1997 television drama film directed by James A. Contner and starring Paula Abdul, Adrian Pasdar and Susan Ruttan. It aired on ABC, January 12, 1997 at 9/8c. The film marks the acting debut of American singer/choreographer Abdul.

Plot
Ellen Collier (Paula Abdul), a well-put-together businesswoman finds comfort and security in her relationship with her loving and supporting new boyfriend, auto detailer Jerry Braskin (Adrian Pasdar), after being savagely attacked by a serial rapist. But other rapes occur just when Ellen thought it was safe for her to slowly break free from her self-imposed shell, which eventually causes her to believe that Jerry is hiding a very dark secret. Eventually, Ellen is confronted with rock-solid evidence that her boyfriend Jerry is the very same man who raped her and she has to save herself before it's too late.

Cast
Paula Abdul as Ellen Collier
Adrian Pasdar as Jerry Braskin
Susan Ruttan as Madge Jaynes
Charlayne Woodard as Det. Duvall
Tracy Nelson as Clara Devlin
Dale Wilson as Ronald Myers

References

External links

1997 television films
1997 films
American drama television films
Films directed by James A. Contner
1990s English-language films